Robert George Colquhoun (1882-1970), was an English bowls player who competed in the 1930 British Empire Games.

Bowls career
He was the champion of Bromley, Kent and England in 1929 and was an English international from 1929-1933.

At the 1930 British Empire Games he won the gold medal in the singles event.

He was the 1929 singles National Champion.

Personal life
He was a retired Army Officer  and coal merchant by trade. He married Nellie Maud Sands, who joined him in Canada during the Games.

References

English male bowls players
Bowls players at the 1930 British Empire Games
Commonwealth Games gold medallists for England
Commonwealth Games medallists in lawn bowls
1882 births
1970 deaths
Medallists at the 1930 British Empire Games